Schorfheide is a municipality in the Barnim district of Brandenburg, Germany. It was established in 2003 by the merger of Finowfurt and Groß Schönebeck.

Overview

Schorfheide further comprises the villages of Altenhof, Böhmerheide, Eichhorst, Klandorf, Lichterfelde, Schluft and Werbellin. Schorfheide is the largest municipality of Barnim by area. Large parts belong to the Schorfheide-Chorin Biosphere Reserve.

In the 13th century the Ascanian margraves of Brandenburg built a castle at the southern end of the Werbellinsee. In 1879 Prince Charles of Prussia had the Ascania Tower erected at the site. Groß Schönebeck houses a hunting lodge erected from 1680 at the behest of the Brandenburg Elector Frederick William I of Hohenzollern, now a museum. From 1950 until 1989 Altenhof was the site of the Pionierrepublik Wilhelm Pieck, a large camp of the Ernst Thälmann Pioneer Organisation.

Demography

Twin towns
 Korschenbroich, Germany
 Mielno, Poland
 Carbonne, France

References

External links

Localities in Barnim